Abdoul Karim Mané (born May 16, 2000) is a Senegalese-born Canadian professional basketball player who last played for the Delaware Blue Coats of the NBA G League. He grew up on the South Shore of Montreal and played for Vanier College in Saint-Laurent, Quebec, where he was a consensus five-star recruit before forgoing his college eligibility to enter the 2020 NBA draft.

Early life and career
Born in Dakar, Senegal, Mané moved to Canada with his family at age seven. He grew up playing soccer but switched to basketball at age 12. By the time he was 15 years old, he was focusing solely on basketball. Mané developed his skills with the basketball program of École Lucien-Pagé in Montreal. After one season, he began playing for Vanier College, a CEGEP in Saint-Laurent, Quebec. Mané had to commute two hours each way while attending Vanier. 

In his second season with Vanier, in 2018–19, he averaged 15.4 points and 6.9 rebounds per game, leading his team to a 16–0 regular season record and the Quebec Student Sport Federation (RSEQ) title. Mané was named RSEQ Player of the Year and earned Canadian Collegiate Athletic Association (CCAA) All-Canadian honors. In his following season, he averaged 15.9 points, 7.9 rebounds and 5.4 assists per game, leading Vanier to a 16–2 record and a second straight RSEQ championship. He was again named CCAA All-Canadian. On April 23, 2020, Mané declared for the 2020 NBA draft without hiring an agent. On July 16, he announced that he would sign an agent and remain in the draft, forgoing his college eligibility.

Recruiting

Professional career

Orlando / Lakeland Magic (2020–2021)
After going undrafted in the 2020 NBA draft, Mané signed a two-way contract with the Orlando Magic on November 27, 2020. He played 10 games with Orlando and 15 with Lakeland, helping the latter win the G League championship with averages of 5.5 points, 5.2 rebounds and 2.0 assists in 22.3 minutes. On April 13, 2021, he was waived by Orlando.

Memphis Hustle (2021)
On October 23, 2021, Mané was selected by the Memphis Hustle 29th overall in the 2021 NBA G League draft. Mané was waived by the Hustle on January 15, 2022.

Greensboro Swarm (2022)
On February 21, 2022, Mané was acquired via available player pool by the Greensboro Swarm. On March 12, 2022, he was waived.

Delaware Blue Coats (2022)
On March 20, 2022, Mané was acquired via available player pool by the Delaware Blue Coats. On December 25, 2022, Mané was waived.

National team career
Mané represented Canada at the 2019 FIBA Under-19 World Cup in Heraklion. He averaged 11.7 points, 4.4 rebounds and 3.1 assists, helping his team finish in ninth place.

Career statistics

NBA

Regular season

|-
| style="text-align:left;"| 
| style="text-align:left;"| Orlando
| 10 || 0 || 8.8 || .231 || .500 || .800 || 1.4 || .4 || .0 || .2 || 1.1
|- class="sortbottom"
| style="text-align:center;" colspan="2"| Career
| 10 || 0 || 8.8 || .231 || .500 || .800 || 1.4 || .4 || .0 || .2 || 1.1

References

2000 births
Living people
Basketball players from Dakar
Basketball players from Montreal
Canadian expatriate basketball people in the United States
Canadian men's basketball players
Lakeland Magic players
Memphis Hustle players
National Basketball Association players from Canada
Orlando Magic players
Point guards
Senegalese emigrants to Canada
Senegalese men's basketball players
Undrafted National Basketball Association players
Vanier College alumni